Barhni railway station is located in Barhni town of Siddharthnagar district, Uttar Pradesh. It serves Barhni town. Its code is 'BNY'. It has three platforms. Passenger, DEMU, Express, and Superfast trains halt here.

Trains

 Gorakhpur–Panvel Express (via Barhni)
 Lokmanya Tilak Terminus–Gorakhpur Lokmanya Express (via Barhni)
 Gorakhpur–Lokmanya Tilak Terminus Express (via Barhni)
 Gorakhpur−Badshahnagar Intercity Express
 Gorakhpur–Lakhimpur Express (via Barhni, Lucknow)
 Gorakhpur–Bandra Terminus Express (via Barhni)
 Gorakhpur–Anand Vihar Terminal Humsafar Express (via Barhni)

References 

Lucknow NER railway division
Railway stations in Siddharthnagar district